The following outline is provided as an overview of and topical guide to the Netherlands.

The Netherlands comprises the mainland located in Northwest Europe and several islands located in the Caribbean that, together with Aruba, Curaçao and Sint Maarten in the Caribbean Sea, constitute the sovereign Kingdom of the Netherlands. The Netherlands is a parliamentary democratic constitutional monarchy. Its European mainland is bordered by the North Sea to the north and west, Belgium to the south, and Germany to the east.

The European Netherlands constitutes the vast majority (by land area and population) of both the country and the Kingdom of the Netherlands, and as such 'the Netherlands' in common parlance often implicitly refers to this entity. Similarly, the articles linked to below predominantly consider the European Netherlands.

General reference

 Pronunciation: 
 Common English country names: Netherlands, (imprecisely Holland)
 Official English country name: Netherlands
 A constituent country of the Kingdom of the Netherlands, which comprises the Netherlands, Aruba, Curaçao and Sint Maarten.
 Common endonym(s): Nederland
 Pronunciation: , 
 Official endonym(s): Nederland
 Adjectivals: Dutch, Netherlands
 Demonym(s): Dutch
 Etymology: Name of the Netherlands
 International rankings of the Netherlands
 ISO country codes: NL, NLD, 528
 ISO region codes: See ISO 3166-2:NL
 Internet country code top-level domain: .nl

Geography of the Netherlands

Geography of the Netherlands
 The Netherlands is: a country, part of the Kingdom of the Netherlands
 Location (European Netherlands):
 Northern Hemisphere and Eastern Hemisphere
 Eurasia
 Europe
 Western Europe
 Time zone:  Central European Time (UTC+01), Central European Summer Time (UTC+02)
 Extreme points of the Netherlands:
North: 53°33′18″N 6°28′41″E
East: 53°10′49″N 7°13′40″E
South: 50°45′01.5″N 5°54′54.0″E
West: 51°18′57″N 3°21′30″E
High: Vaalserberg 
Low: Zuidplaspolder 
 Land boundaries:  1,027 km
 577 km
 450 km
 Coastline:  North Sea 451 km
 Population of the Netherlands: 17,000,002 
 Area of the Netherlands: 41,526 km2  / 16,033 sq mi
 Water: 18.41%
 Atlas of the Netherlands

Environment of the Netherlands

Environment of the Netherlands
 Climate of the Netherlands
 Renewable energy in the Netherlands
 Geology of the Netherlands
 Protected areas of the Netherlands
 Biosphere reserves in the Netherlands
 National parks of the Netherlands
 Wildlife of the Netherlands
 Fauna of the Netherlands
 Birds of the Netherlands
 Mammals of the Netherlands

Natural geographic features of the Netherlands
 Islands of the Netherlands
 Lakes of the Netherlands
 Rivers of the Netherlands
 World Heritage Sites in the Netherlands

Regions of the Netherlands

Regions of the Netherlands

Administrative divisions of the Netherlands

Administrative divisions of the Netherlands
 Provinces of the Netherlands
 Municipalities of the Netherlands

Provinces of the Netherlands

Provinces of the Netherlands

Municipalities of the Netherlands

Municipalities of the Netherlands
 Capital of the Netherlands: Amsterdam, though the seat of government is in The Hague
 Cities of the Netherlands

Demography of the Netherlands

Demographics of the Netherlands
 Dutch people
 Ethnic minorities in the Netherlands

Government and politics of the Netherlands

 Form of government: constitutional monarchy, democracy
 Capital of the Netherlands: Amsterdam. Note that the seat of government is in The Hague
 Elections in the Netherlands
 Dutch general election, 2021
 Dutch general election, 2017
 Dutch general election, 2012
 Dutch Senate election, 2011
 Dutch provincial elections, 2011
 Dutch general election, 2010
 Dutch municipal elections, 2010
 European Parliament election, 2009
 Dutch water board elections, 2008
 Dutch Senate election, 2007
 Dutch provincial elections, 2007
 Dutch general election, 2006
 Dutch municipal elections, 2006
 Political parties in the Netherlands
 Taxation in the Netherlands

Branches of government of the Netherlands

Government of the Netherlands

Executive branch of the government of the Netherlands
 Head of state: Willem-Alexander of the Netherlands
 Head of government: Prime Minister of the Netherlands, Mark Rutte
 Cabinet of the Netherlands: List of cabinets of the Netherlands from 1945 onwards
 Current cabinet: Third Rutte cabinet

Legislative branch of the government of the Netherlands
 Parliament of the Netherlands: States General (bicameral)
 Upper house: Senate of the Netherlands
 Lower house: House of Representatives of the Netherlands

Judicial branch of the government of the Netherlands

Court system of the Netherlands
 Supreme Court of the Netherlands

Foreign relations of the Netherlands

Foreign relations of the Netherlands
 Foreign minister: Stef Blok
 Ministry of Foreign Affairs of the Netherlands
 Diplomatic missions in the Netherlands
 Diplomatic missions of the Netherlands

International organization membership of the Netherlands

International organization membership of the Netherlands
Confederation of European Paper Industries (CEPI)
World Veterans Federation

Economic Affairs and Finance of the Netherlands
 Minister of Economic Affairs: Henk Kamp
 Ministry of Economic Affairs of the Netherlands
 Finance minister: Jeroen Dijsselbloem
 Ministry of Finance of the Netherlands

Law and order in the Netherlands

Law of the Netherlands
 Justice minister: Ivo Opstelten
 Ministry of Security and Justice of the Netherlands
 Capital punishment in the Netherlands
 Constitution of the Netherlands
 Human rights in the Netherlands
 LGBT rights in the Netherlands
 Same-sex marriage in the Netherlands
 Religion in the Netherlands
 Euthanasia in the Netherlands
 Abortion in the Netherlands
 Law enforcement in the Netherlands
 Prostitution in the Netherlands
 Drug policy of the Netherlands
 Gedogen (toleration of certain illegal practices for the greater good)

Military of the Netherlands

Military of the Netherlands
 Command
 Commander-in-chief: the Government
 Defence minister: Jeanine Hennis-Plasschaert
 Ministry of Defence of the Netherlands
 Chief of the Netherlands Defence Staff: Tom Middendorp
 Forces
 Royal Netherlands Army
Korps Commandotroepen (special forces commando)
 Royal Netherlands Navy
Netherlands Marine Corps (special forces marines)
 Royal Netherlands Air Force
 Royal Marechaussee (military police)
 Military history of the Netherlands
 Military ranks of the Dutch armed forces

Local government in the Netherlands

Politics in the Netherlands
 Provincial politics in the Netherlands
 Water board
 Municipal politics in the Netherlands

History of the Netherlands

 Military history of the Netherlands

Culture of the Netherlands

Culture of the Netherlands
 Architecture of the Netherlands
Dutch Baroque architecture
Dutch Colonial architecture
Dutch Colonial Revival architecture
 Cannabis in the Netherlands
 Cuisine of the Netherlands
 Ethnic minorities in the Netherlands
 Festivals in the Netherlands
 Music festivals in the Netherlands (category)
 Cabaret
 Languages of the Netherlands
 Media in the Netherlands
 National symbols of the Netherlands
 Coat of arms of the Netherlands
 Flag of the Netherlands
 National anthem of the Netherlands
 Dutch people
 Prostitution in the Netherlands
 Public holidays in the Netherlands
 Records of the Netherlands
 Religion in the Netherlands
 Buddhism in the Netherlands
 Christianity in the Netherlands
 Hinduism in the Netherlands
 Islam in the Netherlands
 Judaism in the Netherlands
 Sikhism in the Netherlands
 World Heritage Sites in the Netherlands

Arts in the Netherlands
 Art in the Netherlands
 Cinema of the Netherlands
 Literature of the Netherlands
 Music of the Netherlands
 Television in the Netherlands
 Theatre in the Netherlands

Sports in the Netherlands

Sports in the Netherlands
 Football in the Netherlands

Economy and infrastructure  of the Netherlands

Economy of the Netherlands
 Economic rank, by nominal GDP (2007): 16th (sixteenth)
 Agriculture in the Netherlands
 Banking in the Netherlands
 National Bank of the Netherlands
 Communications in the Netherlands
 Internet in the Netherlands
 Companies of the Netherlands
Currency of the Netherlands: Euro (see also: Euro topics)
ISO 4217: EUR
 Energy in the Netherlands
 Energy policy of the Netherlands
 Oil industry in the Netherlands
 Health care in the Netherlands
 Mining in the Netherlands
 Amsterdam Stock Exchange
 AEX index
 Tourism in the Netherlands
 Transport in the Netherlands
 Airports in the Netherlands
 Cycling in the Netherlands
 Rail transport in the Netherlands
 Road transport in the Netherlands
 Roads in the Netherlands
 Water supply and sanitation in the Netherlands

Education in the Netherlands

Education in the Netherlands

See also

Netherlands
Index of Netherlands-related articles
List of international rankings
Member state of the European Union
Member state of the North Atlantic Treaty Organization
Member state of the United Nations
Outline of Europe
Outline of geography

References

External links

About the Netherlands -- Dutch Ministry of Foreign Affairs
Overheid.nl - official Dutch government portal
Government.nl - official Dutch government web site
 
CIA - The World Factbook -- Netherlands
CBS - Key figures from the Dutch bureau of statistics

Local news and features on the Netherlands,Expatica
Holland.com - English website of the Netherlands tourist office

Netherlands
Outline